Charleston earthquake may refer to:
 1886 Charleston earthquake
 1895 Charleston earthquake